Golojeh (also Romanized as Goljeh; also known as Golūjeh, Gūljeh, Guludzhakh, Gulujāh, and Koljeh) is a village in Qareh Poshtelu-e Bala Rural District, Qareh Poshtelu District, Zanjan County, Zanjan Province, Iran. At the 2006 census, its population was 374, in 84 families.

References 

Populated places in Zanjan County